Agenda is an African peer-reviewed academic journal of feminism, which was established in 1987 as a volunteer project in South Africa and is published by UNISA Press in collaboration with Routledge. In addition to publishing articles and other entries, the journal tutors young writers and since 2002 has a radio show, Turning Up the Volume on Gender Equity. Since 1991 it publishes four issues per year.

See also
 Feminist Africa

References

External links 
 
 Agenda page at Taylor & Francis website

Feminist journals
Area studies journals
Quarterly journals
Routledge academic journals
Publications established in 1987
English-language journals